Jalan Sungai Dua (Penang state road P198) is a major road on the mainland in Penang, Malaysia.

There is another Jalan Sungai Dua P15 in the Gelugor vicinity on the island in Penang.

List of junctions

Roads in Penang